The Torchwood Archive is a Big Finish Productions audio drama celebrating the 10th Anniversary of the British science fiction television series Torchwood, a spin-off of the long-running British science fiction television series  Doctor Who. The story was written by James Goss and stars the majority of the original television cast including John Barrowman, Eve Myles and Gareth David-Lloyd as Captain Jack Harkness, Gwen Cooper and Ianto Jones, respectively.

It was released 21 October 2016 and made available to purchase on CD and as a download.

Plot
Far in the future, in the middle of a vast war; Jeremaiah Bash Henderson pays a visit to a desolate asteroid. Upon the asteroid a forgotten outpost inside which is an archive. Within the secrets of an age old Earth institute dating back to the 19th century, an institute known only as: Torchwood. Jeremiah's goal: to learn something very important. However, first he must get past the ghosts of long since dead Torchwood operatives and the tales they have to tell.

Continuity
 Alex Hopkins was first introduced in the TV series' episode 'Fragments' from series two, with Julian Lewis Jones reprising his role as Hopkins.
 The Little Girl was introduced in the TV series episode 'Dead Man Walking' and reappeared in 'Fragments'. Kerry Gooderson takes over the role from Skye Bennett.
 Madeline mentions the death of George Wilson from the first Big Finish Torchwood play, "The Conspiracy".
 Tracy-Ann Oberman reprises her role as Yvonne Hartman, the director of Torchwood One. She first appeared in the Doctor Who episodes "Army of Ghosts" and "Doomsday", as well as the previous Big Finish audio play "One Rule".
 Toshiko mentions a way in which the world's fields could be manipulated in order to prevent death. This was seen occurring in the fourth season of the TV series, Miracle Day.
 The Torchwood Archive was previously mentioned in the Doctor Who episode "The Satan Pit". Characters who featured worked on behalf of the archive.
 Paul Clayton portrays Mr. Colchester. Mr Colchester would later appear as a full-fledged member of the Torchwood team in Aliens Among Us, a 12 part Big Finish drama promoted as the fifth season following the events of Miracle Day.

Production
The play was recorded over the span of many months. The cast recorded their dialogue whilst subsequently recording other Torchwood scripts for Big Finish Productions.

References

External links

2016 audio plays
2016 radio dramas
Radio plays based on Torchwood